Grauer's swamp warbler (Bradypterus graueri) is a species of Old World warbler in the family Locustellidae.
It is found in Burundi, Democratic Republic of the Congo, Rwanda, and Uganda.
Its natural habitats are freshwater lakes and freshwater marshes.
It is threatened by habitat loss.

The Grauer's swamp warbler is endemic to the Albertine Rift and is found in montane swamps above 1900m.  An investigation of the species population genetic structure revealed three clades across this region: clade 1, Virunga Volcanoes and Kigezi Highlands; clade 2, Rugege Highlands; and clade 3, Kahuzi-Biega Highlands (with clades 2 and 3 being sister groups).  The divergence between these clades is thought to be a result of landscape dynamics and a historic period of aridity.

The name commemorates the German zoologist Rudolf Grauer who collected natural history specimens in the Belgian Congo.

References

External links
 BirdLife Species Factsheet. 

Grauer's swamp warbler
Birds of Central Africa
Grauer's swamp warbler
Taxa named by Oscar Neumann
Taxonomy articles created by Polbot